Danimals is an American brand of low-fat drinkable yogurt. Launched by Dannon in 1994, it is decorated with pictures of wild animals and is popular among children and in school lunches.

History 
Danimals parent company Dannon popularized yogurt in the United States in the 1950s and has remained the nation's leading producer of yogurt. Danimals was released in 1994 and initially donated a small part of their proceeds to the National Wildlife Federation. Intended to be marketed to children, Dannon's marketing team told a New York Times reporter that "Yogurt hasn't been very kid-friendly in the past because the taste was too sour. This is a way of creating a new generation of yogurt eaters."

Variations 
One variation of the product is Danimals Yo-Tubes, which lets kids squeeze yogurt out of a tube. The same design concept is used in Danimals Squeezables.

In 2020, Danimals launched Super Danimals, a probiotic version of their product advertised as supporting the immune system.

Ingredients and nutrition 
Danimals used to have 14 grams of sugar per serving, but in 2013 Dannon cut the sugar in the product to 9 grams per 50-calorie serving, accounting for 72 percent of the total calories. Their fruit flavors do not contain any real fruit. As of 2019, their products are Non-GMO Project verified.

References 

Brand name yogurts
Groupe Danone brands
Drink brands
Products introduced in 1994